Barbara Thomson (alternatively spelled Barbara Thompson) is the current Deputy Minister of Environmental Affairs in South Africa.

See also

African Commission on Human and Peoples' Rights
Constitution of South Africa
History of the African National Congress
Politics in South Africa
Provincial governments of South Africa

References

Living people
21st-century South African women politicians
21st-century South African politicians
1954 births